The following are the national records in Olympic weightlifting in Norway. Records are maintained in each weight class for the snatch lift, clean and jerk lift, and the total for both lifts by the Norwegian Weightlifting Federation.

Current records

Men

Women

Historical records

Men (1998–2018)

Women (1998–2018)

References
General
Norwegian records 
Specific

External links
Norwegian Weightlifting Federation website 
Historical Norwegian records 

Norway
records
Olympic weightlifting
weightlifting